Cabela's Ultimate Deer Hunt is the first to be released in the Ultimate Deer Hunt series.

The game was published by Activision, in conjunction with hunting supply company Cabela's.

External links

2001 video games
Windows games
Windows-only games
Activision games
Cabela's video games
Video games developed in the United States